The 1970 season in Swedish football, starting April 1970 and ending November 1970:

Honours

Official titles

Notes

References 
Online

 
Seasons in Swedish football